Tanay Gajjar is an Indian sound recording engineer. He presently works as a Sound engineer in Hindi cinema.

Early life and career
Tanay Gajjar was born and raised in Mumbai. He started his career in BR Films Studio in 1995. Two years after that, he then joined Sumi Audio Vision where he headed the audio studio for 2 years. In 2000, he headed one of India's leading sound recording studios, AvA Entertainment Pvt Ltd. in Mumbai and worked there for 12 years. In 2012, he finally set up his own recording, mixing and mastering studio and called it Wow&flutteR.

Having worked extensively with music stalwarts, he also works very frequently with noted Bollywood Music Directors.

He has worked on over 200 films in the capacity of sound designer, sound editor, song and background score recording, mixing and mastering.

He has recorded, mixed and mastered numerous successful Pop, Classical, Fusion and Semi Classical Music Albums, national and international.
He has been nominated innumerable number of times for prominent awards and recognitions. He has received an IIFA( Indian international Film Awards) award, a Sahara Sangeet Award, a  Zee cine Award, and an IRAA (Indian Recording Arts & Artists) award.
He has also been awarded a special recognition award for his work done in the musical recreation and digital restoration of the film Mughal-e-Azam.
 
Apart from being a Studio engineer, he has also been a pioneer as a Live Sound engineer with the following leading artists :- Dr. L Subramaniam, kavita Krishnamurty, Shubha Mudgal, Sunidhi Chauhan, Suzanne D’ Mello,
, KK, to name a few. 
He currently tours with two of Bollywood's leading singers., Sunidhi Chauhan, Shaan, Farhan Akhtar
 
Beyond that, he designs and provides acoustical consultation for Recording Studios, Mini theaters and Home Theater solutions as well as Live Sound Reinforcement. He has designed and built few recording studios, two mini theaters, most prolifically, the one at Mani Bhavan in Mumbai, it was from Mani Bhavan that Gandhi initiated the Non-Cooperation, Satyagraha, Swadeshi, Khadi and Khilafat movements.

Filmography
 Shastra
 Aur Pyaar Ho Gaya
 Baadshah
 Dushman
 Paanch
 Kaho naa Pyaar hai
 Asambhav
 Hamara Dil aapke paas hai
 Hu Tu Tu
 Hello Brother
 Cchal
 Dhund
 Desh Devi
 Kaise kahoon Ke Pyaar Hai
 Tujhe Meri kasam
 Victoria No. 203
 Pyaar Deewana Hota Hai
 Hum Tumpe Marte hai
 Taj Mahal- An Eternal Love Story
 Hu Kisise Kum Nahin
 Hum Tumhaare hai Sanam
 China Gate
 Duplicate
 Soldier
 Mission Kashmir
 Gadar
 Kachche Dhaage
 Baaz a bird in danger
 Julie
 Monsoon Wedding
 Mughal E Azam
 Paa
 Cheeni Kum
 Saheb Biwi Aur Gangster
 Life of Pi
 Jism 2
 Dil Ka Rishta
 The Hero- Love Story of a spy
 Janasheen
 Dus Kahaaniyan
 Tujhe meri Kasam
 Pinjar
 Yun Hota toh kya hota
 Sunday
 2 States
 Dil Dhadakne Do
 Katti Batti
 Hero
 Manjhi-The mountain man
 Welcome Back

Accolades

References

External links
 
 Personal site

Sound recordists
Indian filmmakers
1973 births
Musicians from Mumbai
Living people